K. S. Ravichandran in an Indian politician and a Member of the Legislative Assembly of Tamil Nadu. He was elected to the Tamil Nadu legislative assembly from Egmore (SC) constituency as an Dravida Munnetra Kazhagam candidate in 2016.

References 

Tamil Nadu MLAs 2016–2021
Dravida Munnetra Kazhagam politicians
Living people
1970 births